Gresha Schulling (born 1983, Colombo) is a Sri Lankan musician. She has been hailed as a rising star in the world of popular music in South Asia.

She comes from a distinguished musical family from Sri Lanka. Gresha was educated in Jeddah, Saudi Arabia at the Continental School, and in Sri Lanka. She took to music while she was in Saudi Arabia and even won a 'battle of the bands' contest in her school.

When she returned to Sri Lanka she decided to follow her in popular music after she completed her GCE Advanced Levels.

Cold Cold Night Christmas Single
Gresha has recorded her debut Christmas single 'Cold Cold Night.' The Christmas song was written by the father and son duo, the distinguished Sri Lanka-born singer/songwriter Nimal Mendis and his son Paul Marie Mendis. 'Cold Cold Night' was released by Media Eye Music in the United Kingdom in November 2007.

The BBC said Gresha Schuilling was attempting to reach the No.1 spot in the Christmas Charts of 2007.

Gresha Schuilling is recording her debut album in Colombo and it was scheduled to be released in the summer of 2008. Media Eye Music in London released her 'Cold Cold Night' Christmas single on download through the mediaeyeproductions website.

She has also recorded the Nimal Mendis classic from the iconic Sri Lankan film, 'Ganga Addara.' The original song was recorded by the Sri Lankan film star, the late Vijaya Kumaratunga. 'Ganga Addara' will be released on her debut album.

Sri Lanka's Ambassador for Autism
Gresha Schuilling was appointed Sri Lanka's Ambassador for Autism by the Autism Awareness Campaign UK and Sri Lanka. She is determined to make a difference in the lives of all people with autism and Asperger syndrome in her island home. Gresha has been raising awareness of the condition - an estimated 39,000 children in Sri Lanka are on the autism spectrum.
Gresha said: “Autistic is the adjective of a developmental disorder of the brain, NOT a definition of who a person is! Educate yourselves and others on this disorder more common than Down Syndrome or cystic fibrosis. It is four times more common in boys than in girls and is said to be as common as one in every 250 children born in recent years. It is our duty as people who have been given the talent and opportunity to do everything we can to increase awareness of Autism. Ignorance in this case is as far from bliss as it can get.”

See also
Sri Lanka Broadcasting Corporation
Burgher People
List of Sri Lankan musicians
Nimal Mendis
Autism Awareness Campaign UK

References

External links
 MediaEye Productions/MediaEye Music:Sri Lanka's Singing Sensation Gresha Schuilling
 World Music Central:Gresha Schuilling releases Christmas Single in London
 Top40-charts.com Gresha Schuilling releases Debut Christmas Single in London
 Blogger News Network:Gresha Schuilling releases UK Christmas Single
 Autism Action UK: Sri Lanka's Ambassador for Autism's UK Christmas Single
 UK Autism News: Gresha Schuilling 'Cold Cold Night' Christmas Single UK Release
 Asia Music News: Gresha Schuilling's 'Cold Cold Night' UK Christmas Single
 Autism Sri Lanka Blog: Gresha Schuilling Sri Lanka Ambassador for Autism's Christmas Single

1983 births
Burgher musicians
Living people
21st-century Sri Lankan women singers